16070 Charops, provisional designation: , is a Jupiter trojan from the Trojan camp, approximately  in diameter. It was discovered on 8 September 1999, by astronomers with Lincoln Near-Earth Asteroid Research at Lincoln Laboratory's Experimental Test Site near Socorro, New Mexico, in the United States. The dark D-type asteroid belongs to the 60 largest Jupiter trojans and has a rotation period of 20.24 hours. It was named after the Lycian soldier Charops from Greek mythology.

Orbit and classification 

Charops is located in the  Lagrangian point, 60° behind Jupiter in the so-called Trojan camp. It is also a non-family asteroid of the Jovian background population. It orbits the Sun at a distance of 4.5–5.8 AU once every 11 years and 8 months (4,247 days; semi-major axis of 5.13 AU). Its orbit has an eccentricity of 0.12 and an inclination of 16° with respect to the ecliptic.

The body's observation arc begins with a precovery published by the Digitized Sky Survey and taken at the Palomar Observatory in September 1954, or 45 years prior to its official discovery observation at Socorro.

Numbering and naming 

This minor planet was numbered on 26 July 2000. As of 2018, it has not been named. On 14 May 2021, the object was named by the Working Group Small Body Nomenclature (WGSBN), after the Lycian soldier Charops, son of Hippasus and brother to Socus, from Greek mythology. Charops was wounded by the Greek hero Odysseus in the Trojan War.

Physical characteristics 

In the SDSS-based taxonomy, Charops is a dark D-type asteroid. It has also been characterized as a D-type by Pan-STARRS' survey, while the Collaborative Asteroid Lightcurve Link (CALL) assumes it to be a C-type asteroid.

Rotation period 

Several rotational lightcurves of Charops have been obtained from photometric observations by Daniel Coley and Robert Stephens at GMARS  and the Center for Solar System Studies, California. Analysis of the best-rated lightcurve from October 2011 gave a rotation period of  hours with a brightness variation of  magnitude. A longer period with a high amplitude reported by Duffard Melita has received a lower rating.

Diameter and albedo 

According to the surveys carried out by the Japanese Akari satellite, the Infrared Astronomical Satellite IRAS, and the NEOWISE mission of NASA's Wide-field Infrared Survey Explorer, Charops measures between 63.19 and 68.98 kilometers in diameter and its surface has an albedo between 0.045 and 0.058. CALL derives an albedo of 0.0565 and a diameter of 64.19 kilometers based on an absolute magnitude of 9.7.

Notes

References

External links 
 Asteroid Lightcurve Database (LCDB), query form (info )
 Dictionary of Minor Planet Names, Google books
 Discovery Circumstances: Numbered Minor Planets (15001)-(20000) – Minor Planet Center
 
 

016070
016070
Named minor planets
19990908